Norm Maracle (born October 2, 1974) is a Canadian former professional ice hockey goaltender. Prior to ending his career in Europe, Maracle played in the National Hockey League for the Detroit Red Wings and Atlanta Thrashers.

Playing career

Junior
Maracle joined the WHL's Saskatoon Blades during the 1991–92 season and remained with them until the 1993–94 season.  Maracle's level of play during the 1993–94 season would earn him the Del Wilson Trophy for best goaltender in the WHL.  Prior to the 1993–94 seasons, the Detroit Red Wings drafted Maracle in the 5th Round, 126th overall, in the 1993 NHL Entry Draft.

Professional

Detroit
For the start of the 1994–95 season, Maracle was signed by the Detroit Red Wings and reassigned to their American Hockey League (AHL) affiliate, the Adirondack Red Wings, sharing goaltending duties with Kevin Hodson. For the next two seasons, Maracle remained in the AHL, posting prolific winning records and a high save percentage each season, but was not called up by the Red Wings due to their overwhelming goaltending depth, as he was the fourth goaltender behind Mike Vernon, Chris Osgood and Hodson.  After he had retired, Maracle was honored into the Adirondack Hockey Hall of Fame in Glens Falls, New York, in 2018. He was one of three former members of the Detroit Red Wings affiliate, the Adirondack Red Wings, next to Neil Smith (ice hockey) and Chris Tancill.

While Maracle spent the 1997–98 season as the starting goaltender in Adirondack, he eventually received a call up from the Red Wings and posted a 2–0–1 record in four NHL appearances. He did not see any playoff action that season, where the Red Wings went on to win their second consecutive Stanley Cup championship. He was included on the team picture, and awarded a Stanley Cup ring. However, his name does not appear on the Stanley Cup because he did not play enough games to qualify.

Maracle challenged Hodson for the backup spot for the 1998–99 season. Maracle put up solid numbers during the season and as a result, became Detroit's backup goaltender to Osgood. Maracle appeared in 16 regular season contests, posting a 6–5–2 record and a 91.8% save percentage. Hodson, however, was sent to the Tampa Bay Lightning prior to the trade deadline so the Red Wings could acquire Bill Ranford as Detroit's third goaltender. Due to Ranford's strong showing towards the end of the regular season, the Red Wings kept Maracle on the roster, but designated him as the third goaltender. After the Red Wings defeated the Mighty Ducks of Anaheim in the opening round of the playoffs, they went on to face the Colorado Avalanche in the Conference Semifinals. Osgood was injured prior to the first game, making Ranford the starting goaltender and Maracle the backup. Maracle played in two games against Colorado, relieving Ranford both times. By the time Osgood returned, the Red Wings could not overcome the Avalanche and were eliminated. Not having lived up to expectations, Ranford was not re-signed at the end of the season, and Maracle also fell under scrutiny for underperforming in the playoffs, and his conditioning was also questioned.  Maracle was left unprotected in the 1999 NHL Expansion Draft, and was claimed by the Atlanta Thrashers on June 25, 1999.

Maracle earned the nickname "Miracle" because despite being a borderline starting goaltender, he would occasionally have superb games (including three 50+ save performances).

Atlanta
With the 1999–2000 season in the NHL being the first for the Thrashers, there was some instability in the lineup. Maracle still managed to start in more games for the Thrashers than any of Atlanta's other four goalies (Damian Rhodes, Scott Fankhouser, Scott Langkow and Rick Tabaracci). However, Maracle finished the season with a 4–19–2 record and a save percentage of .890. Maracle's save percentage put him in 43rd place out of 83 eligible goaltenders (goalies who played at least 20 games in the NHL season). The team did not make the playoffs in the 1999–2000 season.

When Maracle reported for the 2000–01 training camp, his conditioning had become so poor that he was reassigned to the Orlando Solar Bears of the International Hockey League, Atlanta's minor league affiliate. Maracle posted an impressive 33–13–3 record at the minor level, his eight shutouts with Orlando are a team record. He also helped backstop the Solar Bears to their first and only Turner Cup victory in the league's final year of operation. His strong minor league performance earned him 13 appearances for the Thrashers during that season. Though his record for the Thrashers was 2–8–3, his save percentage slightly improved.

Maracle appeared in a single NHL game for the 2001–02 season, a 3–0 loss to the Washington Capitals on November 10, 2001; which was his last NHL game. Maracle spent the rest of the season with the Thrashers' new minor league affiliate, the Chicago Wolves of the AHL, as the starting goaltender with Pasi Nurminen backing him up.

For the 2002–03 Season, Maracle remained in the minors while Nurminen ascended the depth charts to become Atlanta's starting goaltender, with Milan Hnilicka, Byron Dafoe and Frédéric Cassivi supporting him. Having run out of options to leave the minors in the North American system, Maracle signed with Magnitogorsk Metallurg of the RSL on June 8, 2003.

Europe
Maracle, better conditioned and in a new system, appeared in 46 contests for Magnitogorsk Metallurg for the 2003–04 season.

Though he signed a contract with the Nurnburg Ice Tigers of the Deutsche Liga at the start of the 2004–05 season, he never appeared in a contest for them. Maracle then signed with the 2004 RSL Champion Avangard Omsk on November 5, 2004, with whom Maracle won the European Cup Championship. Maracle was the starting goaltender for Avangard in 2005–06 season as well.

In 2006–07, Maracle was the backup to Alexandre Fomichev. The team placed third overall in the league and lost the semi-finals of the Russian Super League Championships to the eventual champions, Metallurg Magnitogorsk.

For the 2007–08 season, Maracle signed with the Iserlohn Roosters in Germany's Deutsche Eishockey Liga. Maracle became a favorite amongst Roosters fans, especially for his on ice antics including break dancing.

Maracle joined HDD Olimpija Ljubljana of the Austrian Hockey League in the 2009–10 season, from January to April 2010 he transferred to return to the DEL for Kölner Haie.

Maracle signed with Starbulls Rosenheim, a team in Germany's 2nd tier Bundesliga, in July 2010, he remained as the club's first choice keeper in two seasons in Rosenheim. On May 25, 2012, the Starbulls announced that due to personal issues, Maracle would not be returning to the team.

Personal life
Maracle was born in Belleville, Ontario, but grew up in Calgary, Alberta. For four years, he coached young players in Whapmagoostui, in northern Quebec. Maracle is a Mohawk from the Tyendinaga Mohawk Territory. This Territory is an Indian Reserve located near Belleville, Ontario.

Career statistics

Regular season and playoffs

Awards
 WHL East Second All-Star Team – 1993
 WHL East First All-Star Team – 1994

References

External links

Norm Maracle at hockeygoalies.org

1974 births
Living people
Adirondack Red Wings players
Atlanta Thrashers players
Avangard Omsk players
Canadian ice hockey goaltenders
Chicago Wolves players
Detroit Red Wings draft picks
Detroit Red Wings players
First Nations sportspeople
Ice hockey people from Ontario
Iserlohn Roosters players
Kölner Haie players
Metallurg Magnitogorsk players
HDD Olimpija Ljubljana players
Orlando Solar Bears (IHL) players
Saskatoon Blades players
Sportspeople from Belleville, Ontario
Starbulls Rosenheim players
Canadian expatriate ice hockey players in Slovenia
Canadian expatriate ice hockey players in Germany
Canadian expatriate ice hockey players in Russia